The NAIA Men's Outdoor Track and Field Championship is the annual track meet to determine the national champions of NAIA men's outdoor track and field in the United States and Canada. It has been held annually since 1952.

The most successful program has been Azusa Pacific, with 15 NAIA national titles (APU has subsequently joined the NCAA).

The current champions are Madonna and Doane, This is the first time ever in NAIA History that there was Co-National Champions.

Results

Champions

 Schools highlight in yellow have reclassified athletics from the NAIA.

See also
NAIA Track and Field
NAIA Women's Outdoor Track and Field Championship
NAIA Men's Indoor Track and Field Championship
NAIA Women's Indoor Track and Field Championship
NCAA Track and Field
NCAA Men's Outdoor Track and Field Championships (Division I, Division II, Division III)
NCAA Women's Outdoor Track and Field Championships (Division I, Division II, Division III)
NCAA Men's Indoor Track and Field Championships (Division I, Division II, Division III)
NCAA Women's Indoor Track and Field Championships (Division I, Division II, Division III)

References

External links
NAIA Men's Outdoor Track and Field

Track and Field
College track and field competitions in the United States